SADB may refer to:

StopXam (English:Stop A DoucheBag) a Russian non-profit organization
Sadhbh (name)
Sadhbh, the Sidhe mother of Oisin
Sadb ingen Chuinn, an Irish queen
A Security Association Database, used in IPsec